Janaki Yugantar English Boarding School was established in 2013 at Ramgopalpur, Mahottari, Nepal.
 
The School is facilitated with Smart Class, Science Lab, Computer Lab, a library donated by Bal Vikas Bharati. The campus includes a playground with football field, cricket pitch, volleyball court, kho-kho and kabaddi court. There are sand-pits, swing, slides and see-saws for the primary students.

Boarding facilities for its students (separate hostels for boys & girls) and also run local transportation services for the students from the outer parts of the Ramgopalpur.

External links
Website

Educational institutions established in 2013
Secondary schools in Nepal
Buildings and structures in Mahottari District
2013 establishments in Nepal